Agronomy Journal is a peer-reviewed scientific journal published by American Society of Agronomy. The journal publishes articles related to soil science, crop science, agroclimatology and agronomic modeling, production agriculture, and software.

About 
This journal was founded in 1908 under the name Journal of the American Society of Agronomy, but the name was changed January 1949 to Agronomy Journal after a vote of the members. In its over one hundred years of existence, it has featured more than 30,290 authors, who have published more than 15,232 articles.

The current editor-in-chief is Silvia Pampana in the Department of Agriculture, Food and Environment (DAFE), at Università di Pisa.

According to the Journal Citation Reports, the journal has a 2020 impact factor of 2.240.

References

External links 
 Official website

Agricultural journals
Publications established in 1908